Daniel Beneš (born 19 March 1970) is a Czech businessman and the CEO of the ČEZ Group. He has been with the company since 2004, and was previously employed at Bohemiacoal. He received his MBA at Technical University of Ostrava.

References

Czech businesspeople
Living people
1970 births